Fischenthal is a village and a municipality in the district of Hinwil in the canton of Zürich in Switzerland. Besides the village of Fischenthal, it includes the villages of Gibswil and Steg, as well as nearly 100 smaller settlements.

History

Fischenthal is first mentioned in 878  as Fiskinestal.

Geography
Fischenthal is situated in the upper Töss Valley and is the largest municipality, in terms of land area, in the canton of Zurich.  The Jona river rises near the municipality.  The municipality includes the mountain villages of Fischenthal, Gibswil and Steg as well as nearly 100 settlements scattered throughout the Tössbergland (Töss mountain land). Gibswil is known for the ski jumping hill Bachtelblick-Schanze and the cross-country skiing trail Panoramaloipe Gibswil.

Of this area, 31.6% is used for agricultural purposes, while 63.1% is forested. Of the rest of the land, 4% is settled (buildings or roads) and the remainder (1.3%) is non-productive (rivers, glaciers or mountains).   housing and buildings made up 2% of the total area, while transportation infrastructure made up the rest (2%). Of the total unproductive area, water (streams and lakes) made up 0.6% of the area.   2.9% of the total municipal area was undergoing some type of construction.

Demographics 
The gender distribution of the population was 51.2% male and 48.8% female.

In the 2007 election the most popular party was the SVP which received 52.6% of the vote.  The next three most popular parties were the SPS (12.1%), the Green Party (8.9%) and the CSP (8.3%).

The age distribution of the population is children and teenagers (0–19 years old) make up 31.1% of the population, while adults (20–64 years old) make up 57.1% and seniors (over 64 years old) make up 11.8%.  The entire Swiss population is generally well educated.  In Fischenthal about 70.9% of the population (between age 25-64) have completed either non-mandatory upper secondary education or additional higher education (either university or a Fachhochschule).  There are 743 households in Fischenthal.

As of 2005, Fischenthal had an unemployment rate of 2.19%.   28.8% of the working population were employed full-time, and 71.3% were employed part-time.
In 2014, Fischenthal made regional news because it was forced to spend 87% of its fiscal budget on social support, mostly due to a single family which had recently moved to the village and which consumed a quarter of the municipality's budget or half a million francs in support and special education programs.

 there were 476 Catholics and 1278 Protestants in Fischenthal. From the 2000 census, 60.5% were some type of Protestant, with 56.8% belonging to the Swiss Reformed Church and 3.7% belonging to other Protestant churches.  20.8% of the population were Catholic. Of the rest of the population, 0% were Muslim, 3.5% belonged to another religion (not listed), 4.6% did not give a religion, and 10.2% were atheist or agnostic.

The historical population is given in the following table:

Transport 
Road 16, the Tösstalstrasse, passes through the municipalities three main villages of Steg, Fischenthal and Gibswil.

The road is paralleled by the Tösstal railway line, and the municipality is served by Steg station, Fischenthal station and Gibswil station. All three stations are stops on the Zurich S-Bahn service S26.

The closest airport is the Wangen Airport approximately 12 km from Gibswil.

References

External links 

  
 
 Gibswil

Municipalities of the canton of Zürich